Eric Fischbein (born 11 March 1976) is a Swedish former football midfielder who last represented IK Makkabi Fotboll in Stockholm. He played for Hammarby IF until the 2007 season and, in 2008, he played with fifth tier club FC Andrea Doria from Stockholm.

Fischbein, who is Jewish, was the first person to receive the AGO-award, which goes to outstanding Jewish sports performers in Sweden and is presented by the Jewish sports society IK Makkabi.

External links
  
 Eric Fischbein at EliteFootball.com
 

1976 births
Living people
Swedish Jews
Jewish footballers
Swedish footballers
Hammarby Fotboll players
Trelleborgs FF players
Association football midfielders